Aberdeen Nomads RFC were a nineteenth and twentieth-century Aberdeen-based rugby union club. It provided Scotland international players as well as North of Scotland District players but it folded at the Second World War as it lacked players to continue.

History

Nomads was an uncommon but not unusual moniker for a rugby side. There was an Arbroath Nomads side noted from 1877. An Edinburgh University Nomads side played in the 1880s.

A match between Aberdeen Collegiate F.P and Aberdeen Nomads was played on 25 November 1882. Collegiate F.P. won by a try to nil.

The Nomads played Aberdeen GSFP on 3 November 1883. The match were drawn, but was in favour of GSFP due to a touchdown. It was noted that Duncan, Grant and Bismarck all played well for Nomads.

Nomads played a Hall Russell's Engineers side on 25 October 1884. The Engineers won by 2 goals to 2 tries.

A match between Montrose and Aberdeen Nomads was arranged for 28 February 1885.

On 1 December they had a match against Thistle played at Broomhill.

On 26 January 1889 they played against Victoria at Duthie Park.

The club reached the North of Scotland Cup final in 1904–05 season. However they were beaten by the University of St Andrews.

Disbanding of the club

The club were still playing rugby up to the start of the Second World War. In 1939 they entered a team into the Highland Sevens tournament.

They were named as favourites for the competition. They had Donny Innes, the Scotland international player, as captain. A. R. Taylor played on the wing in the trial match at the 1939 New Year; G. H. Henderson and E. H. Still were the half-back pairing. Their forwards were named as: H. R. Craig and J. S. McLachlan, both North of Scotland District players, and G. M. Lawrence, who was noted as fast and fit.

The Nomads were knocked out at the first round by Watsonians, who stifled the Nomads forwards and did not allow the Nomads back into the match. Watsonians went on to lift the Lauder Cup.

Notwithstanding the talent evidently around Aberdeen at the time, it seems - like a number of clubs - that it could not survive the impact of the Second World War. The 1938–39 season has the last reports of the rugby club.

Notable players

Scotland internationalists

The following former Aberdeen Nomads players have represented Scotland at full international level.

North of Scotland District

The following former Aberdeen Nomads players have represented North of Scotland District at provincial level.

Honours

 North of Scotland Cup
 Runners-up: 1905

Sports clubs in Aberdeen

Other sports clubs in Aberdeen were also called Nomads. There was a hockey side named Aberdeen Nomads. They had a successful women's side; they merged with Bon Accord in 1992.

A golf club named Aberdeen Nomads began in 1972. There was also a curling club named Aberdeen Nomads.

References

Scottish rugby union teams
Rugby union in Aberdeen
Sports teams in Aberdeen
Defunct Scottish rugby union clubs
Rugby clubs established in 1882
Rugby union clubs disestablished in 1939